WKCE may refer to:

 WKCE (AM), a radio station (1180 AM) licensed to serve Knoxville, Tennessee, United States
 WTLT, a radio station (1120 AM) licensed to serve Maryville, Tennessee, which held the call sign WKCE from 1995 to 2018